Bulbophyllum radicans, commonly known as the striped pyjama orchid, is a species of epiphytic or lithophytic orchid with long, hanging stems with roots near the base and covered with brown, papery bracts which partially hide the pseudobulbs. Each pseudobulb has a single thin leaf. A single small pink, cream-coloured or yellow flower with red or purplish stripes is borne on a thin flowering stem that emerges from the base of the pseudobulb. This orchid grows on trees or rocks in or near rainforest in tropical North Queensland.

Description
The flower is  pink, cream-coloured or yellow flower with red or purplish stripes. Flowering occurs sporadically throughout the year but each flower only stays open for one or two days.

Taxonomy and naming
Bulbophyllum radicans was first formally described in 1897 by Frederick Manson Bailey and the description was published in the Queensland Agricultural Journal. The specific epithet (radicans) is a Latin word meaning "rooting".

Distribution and habitat 
The striped pyjama orchid grows on trees and rocks in and near rainforest between Mount Finnigan in Cedar Bay National Park and Eungella.

References

radicans
Orchids of Queensland
Plants described in 1897